Chaetostoma formosae is a species of catfish in the family Loricariidae. It is native to South America, where it occurs in the basins of the Meta River and the Guaviare River in the Orinoco drainage in the departments of Meta and Casanare in Colombia. The species reaches 9.7 cm (3.8 inches) SL. This species is sometimes seen in the aquarium trade, where it is known as the rubberlip pleco or referred to by its L-number, L-444.

References 

formosae
Fish described in 2011